Drewes is a German surname. Notable people with the surname include:

Asbjørn Drewes, clinical professor at Aalborg University
Heinz Drewes (1903–1980), German conductor
Martin Drewes (1918–2013), German World War II Luftwaffe fighter ace
Patrick Drewes (born 1993), German footballer
Paul Drewes (born 1982), Dutch rower
Werner Drewes (1899–1985), German-American printmaker and painter
Wilhelm Drewes (1907–1982), German Wehrmacht general

See also 

 Ted Drewes, restaurant in St Louis, Missouri
 Drews (disambiguation)

German-language surnames